Typhlops is a genus of blind snakes in the family Typhlopidae. The genus is endemic to the West Indies. Some species which were formerly placed in the genus Typhlops have been moved to the genera Afrotyphlops, Amerotyphlops, Anilios, Antillotyphlops, Argyrophis, Cubatyphlops, Indotyphlops, Letheobia, Madatyphlops, Malayotyphlops, and Xerotyphlops.

Species

*) Not including the nominate subspecies.
T) Type species.

References

External links

Further reading
Hedges SB, Marion AB, Lipp KM, Marin J, Vidal N (2014). "A taxonomic framework for typhlopid snakes from the Caribbean and other regions (Reptilia, Squamata)". Caribbean Herpetology 49: 1-61. (Amerotyphlops, Antillotyphlops, Asiatyphlops, Cubatyphlops, Indotyphlops, Madatyphlops, Malayotyphlops, Sundatyphlops, Xerotyphlops, new genera).
Oppel M (1811). Die Ordnungen, Familien und Gattungen der Reptilien, als Prodrom einer Naturgeschichte derselben [= The Orders, Families and Genera of the Reptiles, as a Prodromus of a Natural History of the same ]. Munich: J. Lindauer. xii + 86 pp. (Typhlops, new genus, pp. 54–55). (in German and Latin).

 
Snake genera
Articles containing video clips